The article contains information about the 2019–20 Iran 3rd Division football season. This is the 4th rated football league in Iran after the Persian Gulf Cup, Azadegan League, and 2nd Division. The league started from 3 September 2019.

In total 85 teams (65 teams in the first round in 5 groups, 20 teams in second round) were planned to compete in this season's competitions.

After concerns about COVID-19 pandemic in Iran the matches has been postponed at 1 March 2020 while six weeks of the Second Round and the Play-off matches was remained. The season continued from 30 July 2020.

First round
Each team who lose 2 matches, will be relegated 2 divisions for next season. Therefore, in this stage, the teams which lose 2 matches, will be eligible to play in the provincial 2nd division for 2020–21 season (and not eligible to play in the provincial 1st division)
The top 2 teams from each group and two best 3rd placed teams (total 12 teams) will advance to the Second Round. 3 worth ranked 3ed teams and the teams ranked 4th and 5th in each group and 2 best 6th placed teams (total 15 teams) will be eligible to play in the First Round of next season. 3 worth ranked 6th teams and the teams ranked 7th and lower will be relegated to Provincial Leagues. However all the three worst 6th placed team, remained and not relegated, due to direct relegation of higher-level league to Privincal leagues instead of 3rd Division - 1st Stage (This level).

Group A

Group B

Group C

Group D

Group E

Ranking of third-placed teams

Ranking of six-placed teams 

Hermas Fateh Shiran Tabriz, Shahrvand Ramsar and Roz Mooket Boroujen should have relegated to Provincial Leagues in the next season as the three worst 6th placed teams. But due to direct relegation of Moghavemat Novin Tehran, Azarab Arak and Shahrdari Ardabil from 3rd Division - 2nd Stage to Provincial Leagues (instead of 3rd Division - 1st Stage), they remained in 3rd Division - 1st Stage and not relegated.

Second round

Second Round will be started after first round on 17 December 2019

Qualified teams
Relegated from 2nd Division (2 Teams):

Relegated from 1st Division (According to Competition Regulations)  (2 Teams):

Remaining Teams from last season (16 Teams):

Promoted from 1st Stage (12 Teams):

Promotion and Relegation

Each group's winner (Total 3 teams) will be promoted to the next season's 2nd Division.
Each group's runner-up and the best 3rd placed team among 3 groups (Total 4 teams), will qualify to the Play-off round. In Play-off Round, teams were play two knockout rounds, where the winner will be promoted to the next season's 2nd Division.

Teams ranked 8th, 9th and 10th in each group and the worst 7th-placed team among 3 groups (Total 10 teams) will be relegated to 1st Stage of 3rd Division in next season.

Group 1

Group 2

Group 3

Ranking of third-placed teams 
The results against the tenth-placed team were not counted when determining the ranking of the third placed teams.

Ranking of seventh-placed teams 
The results against the tenth-placed team were not counted when determining the ranking of the seventh placed teams.

Moghavemat Astara should have relegated to 3rd Division - 1st Stage as the worst 7th placed team, But due to direct relegation of Karoon Arvand Khorramshahr from 2nd division to 3rd Division - 1st Stage (instead of 3rd Division - 2nd Stage), they remained in 3rd Division - 2nd Stage and not relegated.

Play-off

First round

Second round

Oghab Tehran promoted to 2020–21 Iran Football's 2nd Division.

References 

League 3 (Iran) seasons
4